LEAP is a 3-day annual tech convention held in Riyadh, Saudi Arabia. It is the largest debut tech event as of 2022, with over 100,000 attendees. It is co-organised by Informa Tech, the Ministry of Communication and Information Technology (Saudi Arabia) (MCIT), and the Saudi Federation for Cybersecurity, Programming and Drones (SAFCSP).

History
LEAP was founded by Informa Tech, SAFCSP and MCIT, and the first event was held in Riyadh, Saudi Arabia, on 1–3 February 2022. The event noticed over 100,000 visitors in the period of three days.

About 700 tech companies, 330 investors, and 500 CEOs and tech experts participated in LEAP 2022. The event tallied to over $6.4 billion worth of initiatives and programs.

The event also conducted its "Rocket Fuel Start-up Competition" where altogether a million USD was awarded to promising start-ups. The event also hosted the world's largest Kaleidoscope with a length of 40-meter.

Speakers and partners
The speaking panel has included many top-level executives, government officials, sportspersons, and subject matter experts, including Abdulaziz bin Salman Al Saud, Börje Ekholm, Peggy Johnson, Stephane Houdet, Eugene Kaspersky, Michel Salgado, Christian Klein, Makaziwe Mandela, and Maëlle Gavet.

LEAP's sponsors and partners include venture capitalists, Fortune 500 companies, government agencies, education institutes and start-ups, including Microsoft, Cisco, SAP SE, Citrix, IBM, Zoom, Hitachi, Ericsson and Huawei.

See also
Web Summit
Consumer Electronics Show
Slush

References

Technology conventions
Annual events